Giuseppe De'Longhi (born 24 April 1939) is an Italian billionaire businessman, and the president of De'Longhi.

Early life
He was born in Treviso, Italy, on 24 April 1939.

He graduated from Ca' Foscari University of Venice.

Career
As of March 2020, he had a net worth estimated by Forbes at $3.1 billion.

Personal life
He is married with two children and lives in Treviso, Italy. His son, Fabio De'Longhi, is CEO of De'Longhi.

References

1939 births
Living people
Italian billionaires
People from Treviso
Ca' Foscari University of Venice alumni
De'Longhi